Microschismus lenzi is a species of moth of the family Alucitidae. It is found in Zimbabwe.

References

Endemic fauna of Zimbabwe
Alucitidae
Lepidoptera of Zimbabwe
Moths described in 2011
Moths of Sub-Saharan Africa